Elections to the French National Assembly were held in Chad and Ubangi-Shari on 2 January 1956. The territories elected four seats to the Assembly via two electoral colleges; the first college spanned both territories and elected one seat, whilst Chad elected two seats via the second college and Ubangi-Shari one. René Malbrant was re-elected from the first college and Barthélémy Boganda from the second college in Ubangi-Shari. In the second college in Chad the Chadian Union and Chadian Social Action won one seat each, taken by Gabriel Lisette and Arabi el Goni respectively.

Campaign
The Chadian Union alliance was formed by the Chadian Progressive Party, the Independent Socialist Party of Chad, the Democratic and Socialist Union of the Resistance and the Radical Socialist Party to contest the second college seat in Chad, nominating Gabriel Lisette and Djeraki Zaïd as its candidates.

Results

First college

Second college

Chad

Ubangi-Shari

References

Chad
Elections in the Central African Republic
1956 in Ubangi-Shari
Chad
Elections in Chad
1956 in Chad
January 1956 events in Africa